Rowland Hill, 2nd Viscount Hill (10 May 1800 – 3 January 1875), known as Sir Rowland Hill, Bt, between 1824 and 1842, was a British peer and Tory politician.

Background
Hill was the son of Colonel John Hill, eldest son of Sir John Hill, 3rd Baronet. His mother was Elizabeth, daughter of Philip Cornish, while the renowned military figures Rowland Hill, 1st Viscount Hill, Thomas Noel Hill, Robert Chambre Hill and Clement Delves Hill were his uncles. He was educated at Oriel College, Oxford, where he graduated MA in 1820.

Political career
Hill was returned to Parliament for Shropshire in 1821, a seat he held until 1832, when the constituency was abolished. He then represented North Shropshire between 1832 and 1842. He succeeded his grandfather as fourth Baronet of Hawkstone in 1824. In 1842 he also succeeded his uncle as second Viscount Hill according to a special remainder in the letters patent and was able to take a seat in the House of Lords. Between 1845 and 1875 he served as Lord Lieutenant of Shropshire.

Military career
Hill served as cornet in the Royal Horse Guards from 1820 to 1824, the year he succeeded to the baronetcy. He also succeeded his father in command, as lieutenant-colonel, of the North Shropshire Yeomanry Cavalry. As Lord Lieutenant, he consented to its amalgamation with the South Salopian Yeomanry Cavalry to form a single Shropshire Yeomanry regiment in 1872. He took command of the new regiment, which he held until his death.

Family
Lord Hill married Anne, daughter of Joseph Clegg, of Peplow Hall, Shropshire, and granddaughter and heiress of Arthur Clegg, of Irwell, Lancashire, in 1831. He died in January 1875, aged 74, and was buried in the family vault at St Luke's parish church, Hodnet. He was succeeded by his son, Rowland. A younger son, Geoffrey, was a first-class cricketer. Lady Hill died in October 1891.

References

External links

1800 births
1875 deaths
Lord-Lieutenants of Shropshire
Hill, Rowland, 3rd Baronet
Hill, Rowland, 3rd Baronet
Hill, Rowland, 3rd Baronet
Hill, Rowland, 3rd Baronet
Hill, Rowland, 3rd Baronet
Hill, Rowland, 3rd Baronet
Hill, Rowland, 3rd Baronet
Hill, Rowland, 3rd Baronet
Hill, Rowland, 3rd Baronet
Hill, V2
Viscounts in the Peerage of the United Kingdom
Alumni of Oriel College, Oxford
Shropshire Yeomanry officers
Place of birth missing